Wiseana fuliginea is a species of moth belonging to the family Hepialidae. It was described by Arthur Gardiner Butler in 1879 and is endemic to New Zealand.

The wingspan is 27–38 mm for males and 33–47 mm for females. The colour of the forewings varies from pale to dark brown.

References

External links

Citizen science observations

Hepialidae
Moths described in 1879
Moths of New Zealand
Endemic fauna of New Zealand
Endemic moths of New Zealand